Mawilmada is a village in Sri Lanka. It is located within  the district of Kandy in the Central Province.

Education
 Colombo International School of Kandy

See also
List of towns in Central Province, Sri Lanka

External links

Populated places in Kandy District